South Passage Point Park is a  park located in the Eastlake neighborhood of Seattle, Washington, USA, directly underneath the Ship Canal Bridge on the south side of the Lake Union/Portage Bay shoreline. It was dedicated in 1977. North Passage Point Park is directly across the water on the north shore.

External links

Seattle Department of Parks and Recreation

Parks in Seattle
Eastlake, Seattle